Château d'Eymet is a château in Dordogne, Aquitaine, France.

External links

Châteaux in Dordogne
Monuments historiques of Dordogne